Wilshire Elementary can be used to refer to:
 Wilshire Private School in Los Angeles
Wilshire Elementary, a school of the Hurst-Euless-Bedford Independent School District in Euless, Texas
Wilshire Elementary, a school of the North East Independent School District in San Antonio, Texas
Wilshire Park Elementary, a school of the St. Anthony-New Brighton School District in St. Anthony Village, Minnesota
Wilshire Park Elementary, a school of the Los Angeles Unified School District in Los Angeles, California